William Bruce Ellis Ranken (11 April 1881 – 31 March 1941) was a British artist and Edwardian aesthete. He was born in Edinburgh, Scotland, to Robert Burt Ranken, a wealthy and successful lawyer, and his wife Mary. He attended Eton College and then proceeded to the Slade School of Art, under the tutelage of Henry Tonks. A fellow student was the actor Ernest Thesiger, who became a lifelong friend; he was painted by Ranken in 1918, and married Ranken's sister Janette Ranken in 1917.

Ranken's first exhibition in 1904 at the Carfax Gallery (managed by John Fothergill and William Rothenstein) in London was well received by artists and art critics. He befriended Wilfrid de Glehn and John Singer Sargent. At the outbreak of World War I, Ranken was living at his studio in Chelsea, a short distance from Sargent's studio, with whom he may have ventured to America during the war years.

Early success 
While in America, Sargent introduced him to Isabella Stewart Gardner, and he received commissions to paint portraits of the wealthy, including the Whitneys, Vanderbilts and Havermeyers. His output became prodigious as he worked in watercolors, oils and pastels. Returning to Britain in the 1920s, he painted many portraits of the British royal family and the aristocracy, as well as the interiors of their homes.

In France during the First World War as a distraction from the trenches, he collected and repaired historical pieces of embroidery for sale with Ernest Thesiger who was invalided and, in 1917, married Ranken's sister, Janette Mary Fernie Ranken (1877-1970). In her biography of Thesiger's friend, Ivy Compton-Burnett, Hilary Spurling suggests that Thesiger and Janette wed largely out of their mutual adoration of Ranken, who shaved his head when he learned of the engagement. On the other hand, it has been said that Janette Ranken was in love with Compton-Burnett's companion, Margaret Jourdain, a fellow Oxford student. Janette Ranken left Jourdain to marry Thesiger.

Ranken purchased Warbrook House, Eversley, Hampshire, in 1918 after the success of his first visit to America. The maintenance and costs associated with the property proved to be too much in the depression of the early 1930s, and he was forced to give up his beloved house. Ranken died suddenly in London in 1941 and was buried near Warbrook, at St Mary (the church is off the A327 road, about 2 miles from the A30).

Public collections
Following his unexpected death from a cerebral haemorrhage, his sister Janette gifted over 200 works to be distributed amongst UK public galleries and museums. Ranken's paintings are held in a large number of museum and public collections, including Southampton City Art Gallery, Portsmouth Museum, Bradford Museum, Reading Museum, Bristol Museum and Art Gallery, Northampton Museum, Derby Museum, Leeds City Museum, National Museums Northern Ireland, Glasgow Museums, City of Edinburgh Council and the Government Art Collection.

Works

References

Scottish artists
20th-century British painters
British male painters
Artists from Edinburgh
1881 births
1941 deaths
People educated at Eton College
Alumni of the Slade School of Fine Art
20th-century British male artists